The 1962 Liège–Bastogne–Liège was the 48th edition of the Liège–Bastogne–Liège cycle race and was held on 6 May 1962. The race started and finished in Liège. The race was won by Jef Planckaert of the Flandria team.

General classification

References

1962
1962 in Belgian sport